This is a list of University of Hull people, including alumni, academics, and staff.

Notable academics

Notable alumni

Other notable people

References

 
University of Hull
University of Hull
Hull